The United States District Court for the District of Arizona (in case citations, D. Ariz.) is the U.S. district court that covers the state of Arizona. It is under the United States Court of Appeals for the Ninth Circuit.

The District was established on June 20, 1910, pending Arizona statehood on February 14, 1912.

The United States Attorney's Office for the District of Arizona represents the United States in civil and criminal litigation in the court.  the United States Attorney is Gary M. Restaino.

Organization of the court 

The United States District Court for the District of Arizona is the sole federal judicial district in Arizona. Court for the District is held at Flagstaff, Phoenix, Prescott, Tucson, and Yuma. Magistrate courts, established to hear violations on federal lands, are additionally located in Grand Canyon National Park, Kingman, and Page.

The District is further divided into three divisions, with each of these having a central office. The divisions are as follow:
 Phoenix Division
 This district comprises the following counties: Gila, La Paz, Maricopa, Pinal, and Yuma. Its offices are located in Phoenix, Arizona.
 Prescott Division
 This district comprises the following counties: Apache, Coconino, Mohave, Navajo, and Yavapai. Its offices are located in Phoenix, Arizona.
 Tucson Division
 This district the following counties: Cochise, Graham, Greenlee, Pima, and Santa Cruz. Its offices are located in Tucson, Arizona.

Current judges 

:

Former judges

Chief judges

Succession of seats

See also 
 Courts of Arizona
 List of current United States district judges
 List of United States federal courthouses in Arizona

References

External links 
 United States District Court for the District of Arizona
 United States Attorney for the District of Arizona

Arizona
Arizona law
Phoenix, Arizona
Government of Tucson, Arizona
Flagstaff, Arizona
Yuma, Arizona
Prescott, Arizona
1910 establishments in Arizona Territory
Courts and tribunals established in 1910